The Hymn of Death is a 2018 South Korean television miniseries based on true events, starring  Lee Jong-suk and Shin Hye-sun.  It aired on SBS from November 27 to December 4, 2018, and is available on Netflix worldwide.

Synopsis
The series depicts the tragic romance between Joseon's first soprano Yun Sim-deok and the genius playwright, Kim Woo-jin

Cast

Main
Lee Jong-suk as Kim Woo-jin
Shin Hye-sun as Yun Sim-deok

Supporting

Woo Jin's family 
Kim Myung-soo as Kim Sung-gyu (Woo-jin's father)
Park Sun-im as Jung Chum-hyo (Woo-jin's wife)

Sim Deok's family 
Kim Won-hae as Yoon Suk-ho (Sim-deok's father)
Hwang Young-hee as Kim Ssi (Sim-deok's mother)
Go Bo-gyeol as Yoon Sung-duk(Sim-deok's younger sister)
Shin Jae-ha as Yoon Ki-sung(Sim-deok's younger brother)

People of Dong Woo-hee Theater 
Lee Ji-hoon as Hong Nan-pa
Jung Moon-sung as Jo Myung-hee
Oh Eui-shik as Hong Hae-sung
Lee Joon-yi as Kyosuke Tomoda (New Japanese actor)
Han Eun-seo as Han Ki-joo (Soprano, piano player)

People around Sim-deok 
Lee Sang-yeob as Gim Hong-gi
Jang Hyun-sung as Lee Yong-moon
Lee Cheol-min as government officer
Kim Kang-hyun as Lee Seo-koo
Jang Hyuk-jin as Dauchi
Bae Hae-sun as Vocal Music Professor

Production 
The first script reading took place on March 27, 2018. Filming began in late April, 2018.

The drama serves as a reunion between Lee Jong Suk and Shin Hye-sun who previously worked together on the KBS drama School 2013 (2013).

Original soundtrack

Part 1

Part 2

Part 3

Viewership

Notes

References

External links
  
 
 
 

Seoul Broadcasting System television dramas
2018 South Korean television series debuts
2018 South Korean television series endings
South Korean historical television series
South Korean romance television series
South Korean melodrama television series
Television series set in Korea under Japanese rule
Korean-language Netflix exclusive international distribution programming